The Literary & Debating Society is located at the University of Galway. The society was founded as the Literary and Scientific Society in 1846, and incorporated into the then Queen's College, Galway, in 1852. It has as its objective "the promotion of oratory among the students of the University, and the faculty of clear thinking and sound reasoning upon matters which may be deemed to be of vital importance".

History

Foundation
The exact circumstances of the foundation of the society are unclear, but it is thought that the organisation evolved from an informal discussion set up in the city of Galway in the early 1840s. The foundation by the Westminster government of a college of higher education at Galway, by means of the Colleges (Ireland) Act of 1845, seems to have inspired the members of this group to put it on a surer footing with the formal foundation of the Literary and Scientific Society in 1846. Meetings of the society were held in public from 1850, by which time the society had become dominated by students of the new college, despite having no formal connection with the new institution. At an introductory meeting on 4 May 1850, chaired by Bernard Norton, John J. Gibson outlined to the assembled public the role and purpose of the society:

"If this Society will elicit the latent sparks of genius in a few individuals, and send forth men of enlightened views and cultivated tastes, to reflect credit on itself and celebrity on our country, then it shall have contributed its mite in tending to elevate your pining, distressed and poverty-stricken country to that literary rank which, from the genius of her sons, she is entitled to hold among the nations of Europe... You have founded a Society, may its results be unprecedented, worthy of their origin, its celebrity unbounded. May men issue forth from this hall, who, vying with the great spirits of the past, shall illumine the future, shall confer benefits on their species and ennoble the land of their birth... And full of years to your last resting place may you retire, conscious of having left behind you a monument – a memorial which shall live ever fresh in the grateful recollection of posterity."

Incorporation into the Queen's College and early development
The society was incorporated into the college as the Queen's College Literary and Scientific Society in 1852, under the patronage of Thomas Moffett, Professor of History, English Literature and Mental Science. By 1860, under the auditorship of John Monroe, the society had achieved significant prestige among the educated classes of the city, who attended its meetings in large numbers, and its activities were reported in great detail by the local press. The 1860-1870 period was the most successful decade of the early society, with figures such as John Atkinson, Antony MacDonnell, T.P. O'Connor, Frank Hugh O'Donnell, Michael MacAuliffe, Michael Francis Ward, Robert MacSwinney, William Thomson and Peter Freyer occupying its senior offices.

The Queen's Colleges at Galway, Cork and Belfast were founded to provide access to non-denominational university education for Irish students. With Trinity College Dublin acting as a university which catered for members of the established Church of Ireland, the student body of the Queen's Colleges was dominated by Catholics and Nonconformists. Belfast was predominantly nonconformist, Cork mostly Catholic, but Galway catered for a good mixture of students, many Presbyterians from the Ulster counties. Relations within the student body were generally quite harmonious, but differences did arise over the 'national question', which was frequently addressed by the meetings of the society (although in an oblique fashion, maintaining the facade that the society's purpose was the discussion of purely literary and scientific topics). Controversy frequently erupted following speeches which were considered disloyal to the crown or nationalist in tone. This occurred most notably in November 1866, when Frank Hugh O'Donnell, addressing the Society on a motion concerned with the conduct of British forces in India, used the phrase "Elizabeth the Infamous" to refer to Elizabeth I. O’Donnell's remark resulted in uproar, and the Society's refusal to prevent O'Donnell from addressing its subsequent meetings led to its suspension from the College for a period of several months. The Society continued to meet during the suspension in the ballroom of Black's Hotel on Eyre Square in Galway City. The Society was permitted to return to the College in March 1868, on the understanding that it would "avoid discussions as to Tenant Right, Repeal of the Union, or such like subjects." Complying rather gratuitously with this condition, the first meeting of the Society on its return to the College involved the presentation of a paper on the topic of "Female Celebrities."

Further controversy ensued in 1869, when the Daily Express and The Times carried reports of 'disloyal sentiments' being expressed at meetings of the Society, causing some concern locally. The Express claimed that at the Society’s meetings:

“...political harangues of an exciting nature are delivered, and hostile sentiments towards England are uttered in the presence of the lower classes, who cheer them to the echo and hiss at every loyal expression.”

Towards the end of 1869, the College was shaken by the fallout from claims by Andrew Smith Melville regarding the standard of education provided to medical students in Galway. Melville’s claims, which resulted in his suspension from the College, were publicly supported by Frank Hugh O'Donnell, by then a graduate, whose brother Charles James O'Donnell was then a prominent member of the Society. Ultimately, an appeal to the queen by Melville led to an extraordinary visitation of the College to investigate the matter. Following harsh treatment of Charles James O'Donnell by the college authorities over the matter, two factions developed within the Society – a group which supported O’Donnell and was sympathetic towards Melville’s complaints, and a group who supported the position of the College authorities. The matter came to a head in a series of heated meetings, when a contested attempt to expel the Society’s secretary, Thomas Maguire, led to the resignation of the Auditor, several members of the committee, and a member of the academic staff of the college. The final meeting in the series, on 10 March 1870, broke up in confusion, and was followed by riots along the banks of the Eglinton Canal and an early-morning duel with pistols between the main protagonists.

Later Queen's College era
From 1883, the reform of the Irish university system with the dissolution of the old Queen’s University and the foundation of the Royal University in its place had a seriously detrimental effect on the number of students enrolling at Q.C.G. The Society also suffered, and the status and prominence within the city of Galway of its debates and addresses declined. Consequently, press reports from the era are few, but they suggest that the Society did not shy away from the discussion of contentious social and political matters – deciding by a large majority in the 1880s that the mental faculties of the sexes were not equal, that war was a proper means of settling the disputes of nations, that socialism should not be encouraged, and that France had benefited by the revolution. By the 1880s, the name of the Society had formally changed to "Literary and Debating Society", a title commonly used by convention as early as 1864.

Female students were admitted to the college for the first time in 1887, and the first lecture ever delivered by a female speaker at Q.C.G. took place under the auspices of the Society in March 1896, when Mrs Anderson, B.A., delivered a paper entitled "An Hour with the Irish Poets." The first female members of the Society’s committee, Miss Lillian Steinberger and a Miss Stevenson, were elected in 1905. Many years later, the Lit & Deb became the first debating society in an Irish university to have a female auditor, with the election of Clare Fitzgerald in 1942.

The Society’s first recorded participation in an intervarsity debate was in 1906, when William F. Burke represented the Lit & Deb at an event hosted by Queen’s College, Cork. In 1913, the Society was entrusted with the task of publishing the College Annual, "U.C.G.", which had been founded as "Q.C.G." in 1902 and had been dormant since 1907.

The Lit & Deb served as the sole representative forum for students of the college until the establishment of a Students’ Representative Council as an offshoot of the Society in 1911, under the direction of Bryan Cusack. This council was short-lived, but the re-establishment of the body was proposed by Conor O’Malley, auditor of the 1913-1914 session, in his inaugural address in November 1913. The council was firmly established by the mid-1920s, and was formally developed into the university’s Students’ Union in the late 1960s.

Independence and Civil War
The political turmoil of the struggle for Irish independence began to affect the Society from 1913, when the members voted by a margin of 71 votes to 19 in favour of the establishment of a corps of the Irish Volunteers in the college. A rule preventing discussion of the ‘National Question’ was imposed by the college authorities, and remained in place until after the conclusion of the civil war. This rule did not prevent the members of the Society from engaging in political activities; the College Annual for the 1915-1916 session contains a note apologising for its delayed publication, as "the editor was arrested during the rising, and the proofs confiscated." That editor, Cornelius O’Leary, who had been arrested and held on a naval vessel in Galway bay for some time in the aftermath of the rising, was elected Auditor of the Society in the following year. Members of the Lit & Deb were prominent on both sides of the divide in the civil war – Thomas Derrig, a member of the 1916-1917 committee, lost an eye due to gunshot wounds sustained while escaping from Free State custody, while Patrick Lenihan returned from service with the army of the Free State to become auditor for the 1923-1924 session.

Free State era
Due to the severe financial pressures on the government of the Irish Free State, U.C.G. found itself threatened with funding cutbacks in the 1920s. Among the measures the college took in response was to brand itself as Ireland’s only university with a Gaelic ethos, and an emphasis on the use of the Irish Language. This effort culminated in the University College Galway Act, 1929, which charged U.C.G. with a formal responsibility to promote the use of the Irish language, and provided a consequent increase in funding for the institution.

As a result, the Lit & Deb found itself under pressure to conduct its business through the Irish language, and to conform to the ‘Gaelic ethos’ of the college. Representatives of U.C.G. were required to wear a kilt at intervarsity debates, but more militant cultural nationalists still perceived the Lit & Deb as a conservative relic of the old Anglo-Irish establishment. In the late 1920s, efforts were made by Galway County Council to require the college to ban the playing of rugby, as a ‘foreign sport’, on the basis that were rugby to continue as a recognised sport in the college, students of the college would be deprived of County Council Scholarships. The Lit & Deb was strong in its opposition to this proposal, and at a meeting in March 1929, during the auditorship of Martin J. Newell, carried by a large majority the motion: "That the playing of rugby is not incompatible with the true spirit of Irish nationality". Something of the polarisation of opinion which existed at the time is conveyed by the response of W. J. Concannon, a member of Galway County Council, to an invitation from the Society to speak at the debate:

“Your little misters cannot have the pleasure of my company at your debate on the 8th inst., as your little boys (sic) excuse for oratory has as little interest for me as Irish Nationality appears to have for you. If I could attend I feel I would be able to endure your debate, but pleasure would be out of the question.”

The position of the Society regarding the use of the Irish language at its meetings remained unclear, and gave rise to certain tensions – indeed, visiting the Lit & Deb as a representative of U.C.D. at an inter-varsity debate in 1929, Cearbhall Ó Dálaigh pointedly delivered his entire speech in Irish. In the early 1930s, the matter was resolved by a decision of the college that the Lit & Deb would conduct its debates primarily through the medium of English, while another society, An Cumann Éigse agus Seanchais, would facilitate Irish-language debate on campus.

'The Emergency' and its aftermath
The Society continued through the 1930s as the principal student forum in the college. Its debates through the 1930s track the rise of fascism in Europe, with motions such as ‘that the rise of a fascist state in Spain would constitute a grave menace to the peace of Europe’ and ‘that intense nationalism is detrimental to human progress’. When the second world war broke out in 1939, the society debated: ‘that it is the opinion of this House that, in view of the threat to small nations, the government should introduce conscription immediately’, a motion which was carried by the casting vote of the chairman.

In 1949, the Society played a major part in the college’s centenary celebrations, the centrepiece of which was an international intervarsity debate chaired by Seán MacBride on the motion: "That the ascendancy of technology over humanism defeats the aim of University education". The 1950s saw the development of the ‘Town versus Gown’ debates, intended to integrate the Society with the people of Galway. Publication of the College Annual was again revived during the Auditorship of Ray Cooke in 1957-8.

1960s
During the 1960s, tensions began to develop between the Society and the College authorities. In 1960, a debate on the motion "That the death-knell of Sinn Féin has sounded", due to be chaired by Owen Sheehy-Skeffington, was banned by the College authorities, leading to questions in Dáil Éireann. In 1964, during the Auditorship of Michael J. O’Connor, the Society was suspended from the College following an incident involving a poster. The Lit & Deb found refuge during this suspension with the Dominican Nuns at Taylor’s Hill, and held several debates in the Rosary Hall of their school there, including a Scots-Irish debate on the motion: "that bingo is a boil on the face of our modern society."

The Society soon returned to the College and resumed its meetings in the Greek Hall. The Auditor's chain of office was introduced in 1965, under the Auditorship of Michael D. Higgins.

World records
In 1985, under the auditorship of Micheál Ó Sé, the society held a marathon debate which broke the World Record for the longest continuous debate ever held; the debate, on the motion "that Ireland is Green" lasted 153 hours and 20 minutes. The Society lost this title some years later, but regained it in the late 1980s with a debate on "that this House would go through the motions", and again in February 1995, with a 28-day-long debate on the motion "that this House has all the time in the world."

Administrative structures
The society is administered by a committee elected at the society's annual general meeting; the electorate is the general body of students of the college; while academic staff and honorary life members can speak and vote at any other meeting, and indeed can seek to confer honorary life membership at the annual general meeting, only current members of the student body whom are registered members of the society may vote at committee elections. The chief officer of the society is the auditor, who chairs the society's meetings and has general responsibility for its affairs. The society's constitution establishes several other offices - that of Vice-Auditor,
Treasurer, and two secretaries, currently defined as a Recording Secretary and a Debates Secretary (previously including a Corresponding Secretary).
The constitution also allows the election of such other officers as the society may deem necessary to conduct its affairs. Before the 2008 reform, this included the election of three convenors (for internal, external and schools competitions), a literary officer, a public relations officer, a promotions officer, a society development officer, and a clerk of the house.

2008 Reform:
An EGM was called by the Auditor in 2008 to reform and modernise committee structure, and AGM procedures. Following a debate on the issue, a motion was passed by a substantial majority, where the members agreed to elect the following positions directly at a properly convened AGM: Auditor, Vice Auditor, Treasurer, Recording Secretary, Debates Secretary, Schools Convenor, Internal Convenor, External Convenor and Literary Convenor. The Auditor was then able to appoint between four and twelve ordinary committee members to the committee, whereas ordinary members, deputy schools convenors and the social secretary must be elected at an extraordinary general meeting at present.

As is the case with every society in the University of Galway, the committee's term of office usually begins on 1 July each year, to allow for adequate preparation of events during the first semester of the following academic year, which commences in September, traditionally with 'Gibs' Night', an event where new students get an opportunity to speak on a topic of their choosing.

The society also has a formal patron (Nobel laureate Seamus Heaney) and will have a new President (currently Dr James Browne, President of the College, assumes that role).

President's Medal
The President’s Medal is the society’s highest accolade. Originally it was an award given to members who excelled in the field of oratory however it fell out of use in the 1950s. In recent times, the committee has resurrected the award and it is now an accolade that recognises the achievements of those outside the society, who excel in particular field. Among the recipients of the award are; Roddy Doyle, Ardal O'Hanlon, Patrick McCabe, Prof. Noam Chomsky, US Senator Mike Gravel, Congressman Bruce Morrison, Desmond Tutu, Nobel Prize winner Prof. Edmund Phelps and former Taoiseach Bertie Ahern. Bertie Ahern was presented with the President's Medal in his hotel after the event on campus had to be abandoned because of a demonstrations by students.

Activities
The society has a strong involvement in external debating, with several winners of the Irish Times Debating Competition and even the World University Debating Championship among its alumni. The society also contributes to the debating calendar by co-hosting an annual debating intervarsity, the Irish National Law Debates, along with the Law Society of the University of Galway. This intervarsity has proven to be a great success in the IoNA ('Islands of the North Atlantic') debating calendar, with teams from universities around Ireland taking part, together with a number of teams from Great Britain. The 2006 intervarsity, held on 10 and 11 February, was particularly successful, with a record number of teams (41) entering the competition.

The Society's main meetings take place in the university's Kirwan Lecture Theatre every Thursday evening during the college term. Meetings open with the reading of minutes, followed by a Private Members' Time, which provides an opportunity for topical motions to be debated. The Main Business of the meeting, usually a formal debate, follows.

The Lit & Deb traditionally publishes two magazines. "U.C.G.", the college annual, was founded as "Q.C.G." in 1902, and had responsibility for its publication entrusted to the society in 1914. "Criterion", a literary magazine which was founded by the college's now defunct Arts Society in the 1950s, was revived by the Lit & Deb during the 2001-2002 session, with the responsibility of its publication given to the Literary Convenor, a member of the society's committee. In September 2006, the society also published a magazine aimed at incoming First Years titled "Lit & Debauched". The Society has won the University’s Society of the Year award on numerous occasions, its most recent successes coming in 1985, 1988, 1989, 1991, 1993, 1994, 2003 and 2009. 

The Lit & Deb has always had a connection with schools debating, from hosting the West of Ireland section of the All-Ireland Schools Debating Competition to running workshops and tutorials to help develop the next generation of debaters. This fostering of new and inexperienced debaters part of the societies goals to promote debate, critical thinking and interaction with the issues of the day for all which is illustrated by the Society motto, 'Nunc Nunc Qui Timet Eloqui' - 'Now Now, Who Fears To Speak?'.

Notable Auditors and Vice Auditors
 1974-1975 Patsy McGarry (Arts)
 1964-1965 Michael D. Higgins (Arts)
 1963-1964 Michael D. Higgins (Arts)
 1960-1961 Pádraig MacKernan (Arts)
 1931-1932 Gerard Anthony Hayes-McCoy (Arts)
 1928-1929 Martin J. Newell (Science)
 1923-1924 Patrick J. Lenihan (Arts)
 1893-1894 John Guy Rutledge (Law)
 1873-1874 John Gordon (Law)
 1867-1868 Thomas Power O'Connor (Literary Division, Arts)
 1866-1867 Michael Francis Ward (Medicine)
 1864-1865 Frank Hugh O'Donnell (Literary Division, Arts)
 1863-1864 Antony MacDonnell (Arts)
 1862-1863 John Atkinson (Science Division, Arts)
 1861-1862 John Monroe (Law)

See also
 UCC Philosophical Society
 College Historical Society (Trinity College, Dublin)
 University Philosophical Society (Trinity College, Dublin)
 Literary and Historical Society, University College Dublin
 Literary & Debating Society, Maynooth University

References

External links
Official website
Lit & Deb Profile on the NUI Galway Societies website

University of Galway
Student debating societies in Ireland